The Poet Laureate of New Hampshire is the poet laureate for the U.S. state of New Hampshire.

List of Poets Laureate
 Paul Scott Mowrer (1968-1971)
 Eleanor Vinton (1972-1978)
 Richard Eberhart (1979-1984)
 Donald Hall (1984-1989)
 Maxine Kumin (1989-1994)
 Jane Kenyon (1995-1999)
 Donald Hall (1995-1999)
 Marie Harris (1999-2004)
 Cynthia Huntington (2004-2005)
 Patricia Fargnoli (2006-2009)
 Walter E. Butts (2009-2013)
 Alice B. Fogel (2012-2019)
 Alexandria Peary (2019-2024)

External links
Poets Laureate of New Hampshire at the Library of Congress

See also

 Poet laureate
 List of U.S. states' poets laureate
 United States Poet Laureate

References

 
New Hampshire culture
American Poets Laureate